The Idaho Library Association (ILA) is a professional organization for Idaho's librarians and library workers based in Boise, Idaho.

History 
The Idaho Library Association was founded as the Idaho State Library Association on December 29, 1915, at Boise High School during a meeting called by Margaret S. Roberts, the librarian of the Free Traveling Library Commission. 

Gretchen L. Smith, a librarian at the Idaho Technical Institute in Pocatello, was the association's first president. The association changed its name to the Idaho Library Association in 1962 and became officially incorporated in 1967.

Publications
The Idaho Librarian  was the journal of the Idaho Library Association until 2016. The LiLAC Newsletter is a quarterly newsletter published by the Library Leadership Advisory Committee.

References

External links
 Idaho Library Association website
 Pacific Northwest Library Association

Library associations in the United States
Organizations based in Idaho